The Federal Office of Consumer Protection and Food Safety (BVL) is an agency of the German government that comes under Federal Ministry of Food and Agriculture (BMEL). It contributes towards food safety and grants authorization. It jointly coordinates monitoring programs with federal states. Within the framework of the European rapid alert system, the BVL secures the flow of information between the EU and the Federal States. It is also the German contact point for the inspections of the Food and Veterinary Office of the European Commission. Apart from that, the BVL supports the Federal Ministry of Food and Agriculture in crisis management.

References

External links 
BVL-Website

Consumer rights agencies
Consumer organisations in Germany
Food chemistry organizations
Food safety organizations
Regulation in Germany